Surada (also known as Sorada or Soroda) is a town and a Notified Area Council in Ganjam district in the Indian state of Odisha.

Geography

It is situated at the North-Western border of Ganjam district on the confluence of river Rushikulya and Jarau, bounded by Dharakote, Bellaguntha, Bhanjanagar of Ganjam District and Daringibadi, Raikia of Kandhamal District.

Surada houses the headquarters for Surada Tahasil (6 Revenue circles), Panchayat Samiti (Block) and Block Education Office.

The approximate area of Surada Tahasil is about 308.23 km2 and the total area of Surada Block is 97,474.15 Hectares which is highest in Ganjam district. Surada block consists 26 Gram Panchayats with 270 villages in it, and Surada town (N.A.C.) with 11 wards as an urban administrative body.

Gram Panchayats under Surada Block
Amrutulu, Asurabandha, Badabadangi, Badagada, Badagochha, Borada, Borasingi, Bhagabanpur,  Ekalapur, Gajalabadi, Gangapur, Genja, Gochha, Gopalpur Sasan, Goudagotha, Hinjalakuda, Hukuma, Kulangi, Lathipada, Merrikota, Nuagada, Palakatu, Raibandha, Sarabadi, Sidhapur, Suramani.

Demographics
 India census, Surada had a population of 14,867. Males constitute 51% of the population and females 49%. Surada has an average literacy rate of 68.7%, lower than the national average of 74.04%: male literacy is 55.6%, and female literacy is 44.3%.

History
The name SURADA is derived from Sanskrit which is a combination of two words Sura + Adda which literally means The place of Devas.

This place was earlier known as Surada Gada (ସୁରଡ଼ା ଗଡ଼) under Khidisingi kingdom which includes present day Surada, Dharakote, Sheragada blocks of Ganjam district (also includes some parts of Mohana block of Gajapati district).

In 1476, Raja Baliar Singh divided the Khidisingi (Sorada) kingdom into four different states due to early demise of his elder son. Sorada Estate went to his second son, Raja Sandhadhanu Singh.

Badagada – Raja Daman Singh (Baliar Singh's grandson from his eldest son)
Sorada – Raja Sandhadhanu Singh (also known as Abhaya Pratap)
Dharakote – Raja Hadu Singh
Sheragada – Raja Parsuram Singh (Minor) (Represented by Raja Baliar himself).

When Britishers annexed over Surada they put this Zamindari under the administration of Madras Presidency which is mentioned in List of zamindari estates in Madras Presidency.

Now, former Badagada estate is under Surada Block and Dharakote, Sheragada are two separate blocks in Ganjam district.

Rajas of Khidisingi
 Bera Patta Mallik (Last Kandha king)
 Raja Sobha Chandra Singh (Nala dynasty descendant)
 Raja Purusottama Singh
 Raja Krushna Singh
 Raja Rai Singh
 Raja Preeti Singh
 Raja Kirti Singh
 Raja Padmanabha Singh
 Raja Bikram Singh
 Raja Baliar Singh (Last Khidisingi king)

Rajas of Sorada
 Raja Sandhadhanu Singh a.k.a. Abhaya Pratap (1st Surada King)
 Raja Bhagaban Singh
 Raja Harihara Singh
 Raja Krushna Singh (2)
 Raja Gopal Singh
 Raja Rai Singh
 Raja Shyamasundara Singh
 Raja Gadadhara Singh (Raja Shyamasundara's brother)
 Raja Kunjabihari Singh (Raja Shyamasundara's brother)
 Rani Radhamani Devi (Raja Kunjabihari's wife)
 Raja Upendra Singh (Raja Shyamasundara's brother)
 Raja Shyamasundara Singh (2) (Raja Upendra's son)
 Raja Radhacharana Singh (Raja Upendra's son)
 Raja Laxminarayan Singh (Raja Upendra's son)
 Raja Janardana Singh (Raja Upendra's son)

Religious Places

Hinduism

 Jagannath Temple;
 There was probably a Dadhi Bamana statue prior to the temple exist now. In the second half of the 18th century, Raja Kunjabihari Singh (1775–1815) built the present Jagannath temple in the periphery of his palace. The land where the temple is about 125 feet in North-South direction and about 87-feet breadth in East-West direction. The Jagannath temple is about 65-feet length in East-West direction, about 31-feet breadth in North-South direction and about 60-feet in height.
 Gopinath Temple
 Raghunath Temple
 Panchanan Temple
 There are 5 Shiva lingas in the sanctum sanctorum of the temple. There has been a saying that Lingas were consecrated by Lord Rama while going to Lanka. The present temple built by Raja Narendra Dhabala (935-965).
 Chandra Kalpeswara Temple
 Dakhineswara Temple
 Previously the Shiva linga was at the village which is now under Surada Dam. The linga was then transferred to Surada near Rushikulya river in 18th century.
 Gopeswara Temple
 Balukeswara Temple
 Mukteswara Temple
 Brudha Lingeswara Temple - built by Khindirisrunga king Raja Bhimasen Dev (900–935).
 Purakeswara Temple
 Nrusinghnath Temple - There are 3 nos of Nrusinghnath Temple at Baradi, Matha Sahi and Sana Surada.
 Sri Laxmi Nrusinghnath Temple (In the periphery of Gopinath Temple)
 Sri Chaitanya Temple (In front of Jagannath Temple)
 Maa Kandhuni Devi Temple
 Maa Khunteswari Temple (Situated at the hilltop of Khunteswari Hill)
 Siddheswara Temple (In the periphery of Khunteswari temple)
 Maa Giri Shobhini Temple
 Kanaka Durga Temple
 Krushnalila Kalika Temple (Sorada Punja)
 Ramalila Kalika Temple (Baradi Punja)
 Gramyalila Kalika Temple (Desua Punja)
 Ganesh Temple 
 Aadapa Mandap
 Maa Santoshi & Hanuman Temple (Near Panchanan Temple)
 Panchamukhi Hanuman Temple (Near Surada Jail)

Islam
 Mosque
In the 17th century some Muslims had come to Surada. Nawab Zafer Ali built a mosque in Surada at that time. That old mosque had collapsed.  So, in that place a new mosque was built.

Christianity
 Roman Catholic Church
Christians had come to Surada around 1853. The Roman Catholic Church was built in between 1916-1919. The sound of the church bell can be heard in 5 km. radius around Surada. Around the church, there are four missionary schools. The Father of the Church is head of these institutions. The Bollywood Movie Bheegi Palkein starring Raj Babbar and Smita Patil was filmed here.
Dantilingi Church
There is another old church in Dantilingi village. Every year, a special festival is celebrated in the memory of Mother Lurdu Marry. She was very helpful to the local people while she was alive.

Others
 Sai Baba Temple
 Gayatri Temple at Gayatri Nagar
 OM Shanti Organisation
 Satsanga Kendra

Educational Institutions

Colleges
 Rushikulya Degree College, Estd: 1995
 Keshab Panda Women's Degree College

Schools
 Rushikulya Higher Secondary School, Estd: 1978
 P.C.M. Women's Higher Secondary School, Estd: 1999
 Government Vocational Higher Secondary School
 Odisha Adarsha Vidyalaya, Estd: 2016
 Govt. Sashi Bhusan High School, Estd: 1920
 Govt. Girl's High School, Estd: 1964
 Technical High School, Estd: 1954
 Roman Catholic Mission Upper Primary (R.C.M.U.P.) School, Estd: 1904
 New Upper Primary School, Baradi, Estd: 1959
 Jagannath Sanskrit Vidyalaya, Estd: 1930
 Saraswati Sishu Vidya Mandira, Estd: 1995
 Vivekanand Sishu Vidya Mandir, Estd: 2012
 R.C.M. Boy's Primary School, Estd: 1854
 R.C.M. Girl's Primary School, Estd: 1927
 Govt. Ex-Board Boy's Primary School, Estd: 1895
 Govt. Girl's Primary School, Estd: 1914
 Mahamedan Primary School, Estd: 1921
 Govt. Aided Primary School, Estd: 1942
 Block Colony Primary School, Estd: 1975
 Pragati Public School
 Modern DePaul Public School

Technical Training Institutes
 Rushikulya Industrial Training Centre (I.T.C.), Tatabali, Estd: 2009
 KMIT Computer Institute, Estd: 2014
 SIIT(OS-CIT) Institute, Estd: 2019

Notable people
 Sashibhusan Rath - Social reformer, Legislator, Founder of The East Coast, Dainik ASHA & The New Orissa newspapers.

 Ranganath Mohapatra - Inventor of Odia typewriter.

 Sitadevi Khadanga - Eminent dramatist, novelist.

Transport

Road
Surada is connected with National Highway 59 (India) (Khariar – Brahmapur) and State Highway 36 (Odisha) which connect Surada to other cities and towns of Odisha. The three-wheeler auto taxies and buses are the most important mode of transportation in this town.

Rail
 Brahmapur railway station

Air
 Biju Patnaik International Airport
 Berhampur Airport

Port
 Gopalpur port

Climate and regional setting
Maximum summer temperature is 37 °C; minimum winter temperature is 17 °C. The mean daily temperature varies from 33 °C to 38 °C. May is the hottest month; December is the coldest. The average annual rainfall is 1250 mm and the region receives monsoon and torrential rainfall from July to October.

Financial Institution/banks
 State Bank of India, Surada
 Punjab National Bank, Surada
 Utkal Grameen Bank, Surada
 Axis Bank, Surada
 Aska Central Cooperative Bank Ltd, Surada
 Sahara Credit Co-operative Society Ltd, Surada
 State Bank of India, Badagada
 Bank of India, Badagada
 Andhra Bank, Badagada
 SBI ATM (1), Near SBI Surada
 SBI ATM (2), Near NAC Office Surada
 Axis Bank ATM, Surada
 PNB ATM, Surada
 HDFC ATM, Surada
 SBI ATM, Badagada
 Bank of India ATM, Badagada

Government offices
 Tahasil Office
 Judicial Magistrate's (1st Class) Court
 Panchayat Samiti (Block) Office
 Block Education Officer's Office
 Notified Area Council Office
 Special Planning Authority (Surada)
 O.F.D.C. Office
 Sub-Divisional Office (Minor Irrigation)
 Sectional Office (Irrigation)
 Lift Irrigation Office
 Asst. Agriculture Officer's Office
 Asst. Executive Engineer's Office (National Highway Sub-division)
 Asst. Executive Engineer's Office (R&B Sub-division)
 Junior Engineer's Office (R&B)
 Public Wealth Department(P.W.D.) Office
 P.H.E.D Office
 Community Health Centre
 Child Development Project Office (ICDS Project)
 Sub-Jail
 Police Station
 Fire Station
 Forest Range Office
 Sub-Post Office
 Govt. Veterinary Hospital
 Sub-Registrar Office
 Sub-Treasury Office
 Sub-Divisional Office(Southco)
 Sectional Office(Southco)
 Asst. Engineer's Office(Southco)
 R.I. Office, Surada

Attractions

 There are eight ancient Shiva temples around Surada. It's believed to be very auspicious to do pilgrimage all in one day, known as Asta Sambhu Yatra especially on Monday's of Shravan month or in Kartika Purnima.
 Danda Nacha - Danda Nacha(Jatra) are ritualistic performances held during the month of Chaitra for a period of 13 days. This is considered to be the one of the traditional form of worship. The performers showcase their performances in different villages. The performances are dedicated to Lord Shiva and Goddess Kali, which are symbolically represented by a Agni Danda. The participants showcase various items Agni Danda & a Pole decorated with multi-coloured clothes. The closing ceremony is known as Meru Yatra, which is observed on the day of Maha Vishuba Sankranti, also celebrated as Odia new year.
 Surada Dam (Surada Ghai) - A Big water reservoir holds in its bosom a reservoir amidst uncommon scenic charm. It blends itself beautifully into an enchanting picnic spot. This dam was built in 1896. The water of Padma or Paatma river is reserved in it.  At times, the water of this reservoir is channelised to Rushikulya river for irrigation. There is a Children's park and a picnic spot at the adjacent site.
 Ratha Jatra - As the land of Lord Jagannath, in every nooks and corners of Odisha Ratha Jatra is celebrated.
 Kanta Pidha Jatra - An annual celebration of Goddess Kandhuni Devi of Surada spanning over the hindu month of Aswin.
 Kumar Purnima - Birthday of Lord Kartika. To celebrate this day, all wear new clothes, pray to Moon god & play cards from Dasahara to Kumar Purnami.
 Rushikulya River - One of many holy rivers for Hindus. Every year people celebrate Baruni Mohosava  (birthday of Rushikulya). It originates from Rushi Hills of Kandhamal and the mouth of this river is at Puruna Bandha, Chhatrapur of Ganjam district. It is believed that, Rushikulya is 100 years elder than river Ganga. It is mentioned in many Hindu epics like Brahmanda Purana, Mahabharat etc.

Politics
Surada is a part of Surada Assembly Constituency. Current MLA from Surada Assembly Constituency is Purna Chandra Swain of BJD, who won the seat in State elections in 2009, 2014 & 2019 thrice consecutively. Previous MLAs from this seat were Kishore Chandra Singhdeo (2004) of BJP, before that Usharani Panda of INC who won this seat in 2000, Ananta Narayan Singh Deo representing BJP in 1995 and representing JNP in 1977, Shanti Devi of JD in 1990, Sharat Chandra Panda of INC in 1985, and Gantayat Swain of INC(I) in 1980.

Biju Patnaik had elected from Surada constituency in 1957 state elections.

Surada is a part of Aska (Lok Sabha constituency).

References

Cities and towns in Ganjam district